Saurav Panja (born 15 March 1977) is an Indian former tennis player.

Panja has a career high ATP singles ranking of 863 achieved on 12 July 1999. He also has a career high ATP doubles ranking of 290 achieved on 10 July 2000.

Panja reached the doubles final of the 2000 Gold Flake Open with Srinath Prahlad.

References

External links

1977 births
Living people
Indian male tennis players
Sportspeople from Kolkata